Moreland Hills is a village in eastern Cuyahoga County, Ohio, United States. The population was 3,466 at the 2020 census. It is an affluent suburb of the Cleveland metropolitan area.

History
In 1815, settlement began near the point where State Route 87 crosses the Chagrin River. Orange Township was established in 1820 and became known for its steam sawmills, cheese factories and farms. The village, which in 1831 was still part of Orange Township, was the birthplace of James A. Garfield, the 20th President of the United States. In 1897, the Cleveland-Chagrin Falls Railway spurred residential development in the area as it served as a commuter line to employment opportunities in Cleveland.

In the early 20th century, Orange Township was divided into five municipalities, Moreland Hills, Hunting Valley, Orange Village, Pepper Pike and Woodmere. Moreland Hills was incorporated as a village in 1929, encompassing the southeast quadrant of the original Orange Township.  Moreland Hills adopted a village charter in 1972, defining the municipal corporation with a mayor-council form of government.

What is known as the Orange Conference in the history of the Church of Jesus Christ of Latter-day Saints (LDS) took place from October 25–26, 1831, in what is now Moreland Hills. It occurred at the home of Serenes Burnett, located at the southeast corner of today's Ohio Route 87 and Chagrin River Road (not the house that now occupies the site). The three leading figures in the church at that time, Joseph Smith, Sidney Rigdon, and Oliver Cowdery were in attendance.

Moreland Hills is home to state historical landmark Hiram House, the country's second settlement house after Hull House in Chicago. Hiram House moved its operations from Cleveland to its current site at Harvard Road and State Route 91 in the 1940s.

Geography
Moreland Hills is located at  (41.440456, -81.425210).

Demographics

2010 census
As of the census of 2010, there were 3,320 people, 1,262 households, and 1,009 families living in the village. The racial makeup of the village was 89.6% White, 3.7% African American, 0.1% Native American, 4.6% Asian, 0.1% Pacific Islander, 0.3% from other races, and 1.7% from two or more races. Hispanic or Latino of any race were 1.1% of the population.

There were 1,262 households, of which 32.7% had children under the age of 18 living with them, 71.6% were married couples living together, 5.6% had a female householder with no husband present, 2.8% had a male householder with no wife present, and 20.0% were non-families. 17.4% of all households were made up of individuals, and 8.2% had someone living alone who was 65 years of age or older. The average household size was 2.63 and the average family size was 2.97.

The median age in the village was 49.1 years. 24.2% of residents were under the age of 18; 4.2% were between the ages of 18 and 24; 14.4% were from 25 to 44; 38.8% were from 45 to 64; and 18.6% were 65 years of age or older. The gender makeup of the village was 49.3% male and 50.7% female.

2000 census
As of the census of 2000, there were 3,298 people, 1,286 households, and 1,014 families living in the village. The population density was 455.0 people per square mile (175.6/km). There were 1,341 housing units at an average density of 185.0 per square mile (71.4/km). The racial makeup of the village was 93.00% White, 3.03% African American, 0.03% Native American, 3.24% Asian, 0.09% from other races, and 0.61% from two or more races. Hispanic or Latino of any race were 0.67% of the population.

There were 1,286 households, out of which 31.8% had children under the age of 18 living with them, 72.5% were married couples living together, 4.9% had a female householder with no husband present, and 21.1% were non-families. 19.1% of all households were made up of individuals, and 9.7% had someone living alone who was 65 years of age or older. The average household size was 2.56 and the average family size was 2.93.

In the village, the population was spread out, with 23.1% under the age of 18, 4.3% from 18 to 24, 18.3% from 25 to 44, 36.5% from 45 to 64, and 17.7% who were 65 years of age or older. The median age was 48 years. For every 100 females, there were 94.2 males. For every 100 females age 18 and over, there were 91.3 males.

The median income for a household in the village was $113,977, and the median income for a family was $134,621. Males had a median income of $100,000 versus $42,054 for females. The per capita income for the village was $72,001. About 1.3% of families and 3.3% of the population were below the poverty line, including 3.7% of those under age 18 and 3.4% of those age 65 or over.

Education
Moreland Hills is primarily served by the Orange City School System. Small parts of the village are served by the Chagrin Falls Exempted Village School District.

Notable people
 James A. Garfield, 20th President of the United States (then named Orange Township)
 Ellis Burks, Major League Baseball player and special assistant to the general manager of the Cleveland Indians
 Robert E. Murray, CEO of Murray Energy Corporation
 Diana Munz, Olympic swimmer
 Ben Wallace, forward in the NBA

References

External links

 Village of Moreland Hills official website

Villages in Ohio
Villages in Cuyahoga County, Ohio
Populated places established in 1815
1815 establishments in Ohio
Cleveland metropolitan area